WKIK-FM is a country formatted broadcast radio station licensed to California, Maryland, serving Southern Maryland and the Northern Neck.  WKIK is owned and operated by Somar Communications, Inc.

External links
 Country 102.9 Online
 
 
 

KIK
KIK-FM
Radio stations established in 1995
1995 establishments in Maryland